Manaus Air Force Base – ALA8  is a base of the Brazilian Air Force, located in Manaus, Brazil.

History
The base was created in 1970 and between 1970 and 1976 public facilities of Ponta Pelada Airport were shared with the military facilities of Manaus Air Force Base. In 1976, with the opening of Eduardo Gomes International Airport, all public operations were transferred to the new airport. Ponta Pelada Airport was then renamed Manaus Air Force Base and since then it handles exclusively military operations.

Units
The following units are based at Manaus Air Force Base:
 7th Squadron of the 8th Aviation Group (7°/8°GAv) Hárpia, using the H-60L Black Hawk.
 1st Squadron of the 9th Aviation Group (1°/9°GAv) Arara, using the C-105A Amazonas.
 7th Squadron of Air Transportation (7°ETA) Cobra, using the C-97 Brasília, and the C-98A Grand Caravan.
 4th Aviation Battalion of the Brazilian Army (4° BAvEx) Batalhão Coronel Ricardo Pavanello, using HM-1 Pantera, HM-2 Black Hawk, and HM-4 Jaguar.

Accidents and incidents
28 April 1971: Brazilian Air Force, a Douglas DC-6B registration FAB-2414 en route from Manaus to Rio de Janeiro had problems with engine vibrations which forced the crew to return to Manaus. On the ground one of the right hand engines burst into flames. The fire spread to the fuselage causing the death of 16 of the 83 occupants.
23 February 1973: Brazilian Air Force, a de Havilland Canada DHC-5 Buffalo registration FAB-2372 crashed on landing killing 3 occupants.

Access
The base is located 9 km from downtown Manaus.

Gallery
This gallery displays aircraft that are or have been based at Manaus. The gallery is not comprehensive.

Present aircraft

Retired aircraft

See also
List of Brazilian military bases
Ponta Pelada Airport

References

External links

Amazonas (Brazilian state)
Brazilian Air Force
Brazilian Air Force bases
Buildings and structures in Amazonas (Brazilian state)
Manaus
Airports established in 1954